Lord of the Birdcage is the 16th full-length solo studio album from singer-songwriter Robert Pollard, released on June 7, 2011.

In this album, Pollard uses different songwriting techniques by converting written poems into songs.

Critical Reception 
In a 2011 review, Steven Hyden of The A.V. Club said Lord of the Birdcage "probably won't be this year's 'new' Robert Pollard record for long, but it might very well be the one worth remembering."

Tracklist 
 "Smashed Middle Finger"
 "Aspersion"
 "Dunce Codex"
 "Garden Smarm"
 "You Can't Challenge Forward Progress"
 "In a Circle"
 "You Sold Me Quickly"
 "The Focus (Burning)"
 "Ribbon of Fat"
 "Silence Before Violence"
 "Holy Fire"
 "Ash Ript Telecopter"

References

2011 albums
Robert Pollard albums